National Route 137 is a national highway of Japan connecting Fujiyoshida, Yamanashi and Fuefuki, Yamanashi in Japan, with a total length of 30 km (18.64 mi).

References

137
Roads in Yamanashi Prefecture